Blood+ is an animated television series created by Production I.G. It premiered in Japan on October 8, 2005 on MBS/TBS, and continued with episodes every week (except on December 31, 2005) until September 23, 2006. The series simultaneously aired on Animax, Sony's Japanese anime satellite channel, with its networks in Southeast Asia and South Asia airing the series later. It was directed by Junichi Fujisaku and features original character designs by Chizu Hashii. Fifty consecutive episodes were aired spanning four distinct seasons. Each season is differentiated by opening and ending themes from a variety of artists, with the final episode using the season one ending theme.

Through Sony's international division, Blood+ is licensed for distribution in multiple regions, including Region 1. It began airing in dubbed English in the United States on March 11, 2007 as part of the Adult Swim block of Cartoon Network, where it ran until its conclusion on March 23, 2008. The first Region 1 DVDs were released on March 4, 2008, with a simultaneous release of a single five episode volume and a twenty-five episode box set.

The series was first released to Region 2 DVD in Japan by Aniplex in thirteen volumes. The first volume contained two episodes, and each subsequent volume contained four more. The first volume was released December 21, 2005 and the final on December 29, 2006. All of the volumes have Japanese language tracks with no subtitles. The first Region 1 DVDs were released on March 4, 2008, with a simultaneous release of a single five episode volume and a twenty-five episode box set.

Sony Entertainment began releasing its English adaptation of the series on March 4, 2008. Sony released two versions simultaneously: an individual volume containing the first five episodes, and a six disc special edition set containing the first 25 episodes and several exclusive extras. The second box set, containing the remaining 25 episodes and more extras, was released on October 20, 2009

Each season uses different songs for its opening and ending themes. "Seasons’ Call" by Hyde is used as the opening for the second season, and "Cry No More" by Mika Nakashima is used for the ending. For the third season, the opening theme is "Colors of the Heart" by Uverworld and the ending theme is "This Love" by Angela Aki.

Episodes

Season 1

Season 2

Season 3

Season 4

References

External links
 Official website 
 MBS Blood+ website 
 Production I.G official English website
 Official Sony web site

Blood+
Blood: The Last Vampire